Breakfast Time was a morning local children's television program on WFIL-TV (Channel 6) in Philadelphia, Pennsylvania from 1957 to 1963. It was hosted by local Television/Radio personality Bill "Wee Willie" Webber. Webber played cartoons for the kids and did news, sports, interviews, comedy bits, weather and time checks for the adults. It typically aired weekdays from 7:45 am – 9:00 am and on Saturdays from 9:00 am – 10:00 am. Breakfast Time was Philadelphia's top-rated early-morning TV show for many years.

The cartoons included Bugs Bunny, Porky Pig, Daffy Duck, Sylvester the Cat, Tweety Bird and other Looney Tunes and Merrie Melodies features. Other shows included Popeye the Sailor, The Three Stooges, Ramar of the Jungle & Felix the Cat.

Regular characters on the show included Elmo WiffleWeather (a toy clown on a unicycle who would ride down a high wire to deliver the weather) & Mr. Chix from Channel 6 (eyes drawn on Webber's chin attached to a puppet, inverted via a set of mirrors). The theme song for the show was Bugler's Holiday by Leroy Anderson.

Webber also worked at WFIL-AM and WFIL-FM radio which were co-located in the same building at 46th & Market Streets. Dick Clark was on the same TV/Radio staff. Webber was an occasional booth announcer for American Bandstand which was produced in Studio B.

Breakfast Time was one of the first shows to be videotaped instead of kinescoped. Vladimir K. Zworykin crossed the Delaware River from the RCA laboratory in Camden, New Jersey to supervise an early test. One of those videotapes from January 1963 has survived and can be seen in a YouTube playlist.

References

1957 American television series debuts
1963 American television series endings
1950s American children's television series
1960s American children's television series
American television shows featuring puppetry
Local children's television programming in the United States